Frankenia laevis, commonly  sea heath,  is a low shrub in the family Frankeniaceae. It is native to south-west Europe and Britain and to northwestern Africa, including Macaronesia. It grows on the coast. It is rare in Britain.

Distribution
Frankenia laevis is native to the south-west of Europe (the Balearic Islands, Corsica, France, Italy, Portugal, Sardinia, and Spain), Sicily, Great Britain, the Azores, and the west of north Africa (Algeria, Morocco and Tunisia).

References 

laevis
Halophytes
Plants described in 1753
Taxa named by Carl Linnaeus
Flora of Algeria
Flora of the Azores
Flora of Great Britain
Flora of Morocco
Flora of Sicily
Flora of Southwestern Europe
Flora of Tunisia